Dichomeris ochreata is a moth in the family Gelechiidae. It was described by Kyu-Tek Park and Ronald W. Hodges in 1995. It is found in Taiwan.

The length of the forewings is about 7.2 mm. The forewings are greyish orange with short dark brown strigulae along the margin and scattered brownish-orange scales, especially on the anterior half. There is also a fuscous-brown patch along the termen. The hindwings are grey.

References

Moths described in 1995
ochreata